Procavia transvaalensis is an extinct species of hyrax from the Plio-Pleistocene of South Africa. Remains of this species have been found at multiple sites in the country, including the Swartkrans and Kromdraai.

Description
In comparison to the extant rock hyrax, P. transvaalensis was about 50% larger in linear dimensions. It was considered specialized for steppe habitats and was less closely related to the modern rock hyrax than the other extinct species of the genus.

References

Hyraxes
Pliocene mammals of Africa
Pleistocene mammals of Africa